Ryan Hamilton may refer to:
 Ryan Hamilton (ice hockey) (born 1985), Canadian ice hockey player
 Ryan Hamilton (comedian), American comedian and actor
 Ryan Hamilton (rugby union) (born 1988), Canadian rugby union player
 Ryan Delbert Hamilton, guitarist and singer in American rock band People on Vacation